Anjana may refer to:

Añjanā, the mother of Hanuman in the Indian epic, the Ramayana
Anjana (Cantabrian mythology), a witch in Cantabrian mythology
Anjana, Faizabad, a village in Faizabad District, Uttar Pradesh, India
Añjana, a king of the Koliya dynasty of ancient India
Anjana Jat, a Jat people sub-caste